Gursahaiganj is a town and a municipal board in Kannauj district in the states and territories of India.

Education

Top five school in Gurshaiganj

This school best education provide in a town.

1 J.P Education Academy

2 Aakash Education Centre

3 KC Education Academy

4 SS Girl Primary School

5 City Montessori School

Demographics
 India census, Gursahaiganj had a population of 46,060. Males constitute 24,282 of the population and females 21,778. Gursahaiganj has an average literacy rate of 57%, progressive results in comparison to the 2001 census: male literacy is 57%, and female literacy is 43%. In Gursahaiganj, 15% of the population is under 0-6 years of age.

References

Cities and towns in Kannauj district